Frida Marie Hansdotter (born 13 December 1985) is a Swedish former World Cup alpine ski racer and Olympic champion. She competed in the technical events and specialised in slalom. Hansdotter's father Hans Johansson was also an alpine racer, and she is a second cousin of Prince Daniel.

On 6 March 2019, she announced her retirement from alpine skiing following the 2018–2019 season. In February 2022 she was elected to serve eight-year terms as a member of both the International Olympic Committee and the IOC Athletes' Commission.

Career
Born in Västerås, Hansdotter represented Sweden at three Winter Olympics, and at seven World Championships. She gained her first World Cup victory at Kranjska Gora in 2014, which followed eight runner-up finishes, the most in World Cup history without a win.
She was runner-up in the slalom season standings in 2014 and 2015, and won the title in 2016.

Hansdotter has won three medals in the slalom at the World Championships: silver in 2015 and bronze in 2013 and 2017.

At the 2018 Winter Olympics, she won the women's slalom.

World Cup results

Season titles
 1 title – (1 slalom)

Season standings

Race podiums
 4 wins – (4 SL) 
 35 podiums – (34 SL, 1 PSL)

World Championship results

Olympic results

References

External links

Frida Hansdotter World Cup standings at the International Ski Federation

Swedish Olympic Comiittee (SOK) – Frida Hansdotter – 
Rossignol.com  – Frida Hansdotter – alpine skiing – Sweden
 – 
interview with 19 years old Frida Hansdotter at SVT's open archive 

1985 births
Swedish female alpine skiers
Alpine skiers at the 2010 Winter Olympics
Alpine skiers at the 2014 Winter Olympics
Alpine skiers at the 2018 Winter Olympics
Olympic alpine skiers of Sweden
Sportspeople from Västerås
Living people
Medalists at the 2018 Winter Olympics
Olympic medalists in alpine skiing
Olympic gold medalists for Sweden
International Olympic Committee members